William Edwin Pidgeon, aka Bill Pidgeon and Wep, (1909–1981) was an Australian painter who won the Archibald Prize three times. After his death, cartoonist and journalist Les Tanner described him: "He was everything from serious draftsman, brilliant cartoonist, social observer, splittingly funny illustrator to multiple Archibald prizewinner.

Pidgeon was born on 7 January 1909 in Paddington, an inner suburb of Sydney. He was the son of Frederick Castledine Pidgeon and Thirza Jessie Pidgeon, née White. He was educated at Sydney Technical High School. Pidgeon served in the Royal Australian Navy Reserve between 1927-1930 (Service Number S6342).

Pidgeon was married twice. He married Jessie Graham in 1933. They had one son in 1944. The same year he moved to Northwood, New South Wales where he lived for the remainder of his life. After Jessie's death, he married Dorothy Lees and a second son was born in 1959. From 1954 he suffered from glaucoma in both eyes. This condition led to gradual deterioration of his eyesight and necessitated six operations. In 1965 Hazel de Berg interviewed him as part of an oral history project to interview Australian artists. He died 16 February 1981 aged 72 years.

Cartoonist Les Tanner studied under Pidgeon.

Career

Pidgeon began his drawing career by doing comic illustrations for his Technical High School magazine; at 16 years of age he began a newspaper artist cadetship at The Sunday Times. He studied for a period of 6 months under J. S. Watkins In September 1926, at the age of 17, he had his first comic strip published. The Trifling Triplets appeared in The Sunday News. He was also published regularly in the (Sydney) Evening News<ref>{{Cite web|title=Trove search results for  – Digitised newspapers and more|url=https://trove.nla.gov.au/newspaper/result?q&l-publictag=Illustration+by+Wep&sortby=dateAsc&l-title=508|website=Trove|language=en|access-date=30 May 2020}}</ref> where he was employed as a cadet artist.  He also worked in Sydney for the Daily Guardian, the Sun, the World and the Sydney Daily Telegraph. Editor George Warnecke soon employed Pidgeon as an illustrator on the Smith's Weekly. He also illustrated for The Telegraph in the 1930s.Art Reviews

Pidgeon wrote occasional art reviews for the Daily Telegraph for a number of years, and returned to this in 1974 when his eyesight was failing.

 The Australian Women's Weekly 
Warnecke asked Pidgeon to help produce a dummy for a new magazine The Australian Women's Weekly which he did. Warnecke took the idea to media proprietor Frank Packer. The first issue was published 10 June 1933. Pidgeon commenced his career illustrating for the magazine starting with the first issue where he illustrated a short article on the scotch terrier. Pidgeon collaborated with humourist Lennie Lower during the late 1930s. This collaboration contributed to the magazine achieving the highest circulation in Australia.

In and Out of Society

Pidgeon used the moniker Wep for the In and Out of Society comic strip which entered the pages of The Weekly in September 1933. It had a theme of the emancipated woman.  The leading lady dominated the strip and most of Wep's gentle humour saw the male on the receiving end. Pidgeon used an extreme style that has been considered comic, original and modern in approach and has influenced humorous artists since. Although the strip continued through to the 1970s and drawn by other artists, Wep's work on the strip made it a household name.

War Correspondent

Pidgeon was a war correspondent for The Australian Women's Weekly (Consolidated Press). He visited Darwin, Northern Territory, Papua New Guinea, Morotai and Borneo. He produced cartoons, illustrations and paintings which were produced as covers.

He continued to provide cartoons and art work, including covers until he left full time employment with the Weekly in 1949 with an agreement to do occasional work which he did through the 1950s.

 Portrait Painting 
Pidgeon left The Weekly in 1949 to pursue portrait painting. Commissioned portraits became his livelihood over the next twenty-five years. He was a member of the Journalists' Club Sydney and painted the portraits of practically every club president up to 1976.  Some of his subjects included:

 Don Angel
 Arthur Crouch
 Keith Newman
 Syd Nicholls
 Jack Paton
 Con Simons
 Kenneth Slessor
 E. G. Theodore, Australian politician
 John Christopher Thompson, Catholic priest and educationalist
 Sir William Gaston Walkley, oil company director
 King Watson
 Fannie Whitely, family friend and brother of artist Brett Whiteley.
 Jerry Wilkes

He also enjoyed painting landscapes and other styles.

 Archibald Prize 
Pidgeon won the Archibald Prize three times. In 1958 with a portrait of journalist Ray Walker, in 1961 with a portrait of Rabbi Dr I Porush and in 1968 with a portrait of fellow artist and friend, Dr Lloyd Rees.

Pidgeon was a member of the Journalists' Club Sydney. His first painting of Club President Ray Walker won the 1958 prize.

The 1961 portrait of Rabbi Dr. I. Porush was commissioned for the Great Synagogue by Randwick bookmaker and horse breeder Mr. A. Davis, to mark the Rabbi's twenty-one years of service and in memory of Davis's younger sister Ettie.  Pidgeon had competed in every prize since 1949. This was his second win.

Pidgeon was one of four local artists represented on the Lane Cove Art Panel. In March 1968, at the suggestion of this panel, Lane Cove Council commissioned Pidgeon to paint a portrait of Lloyd Rees for their art collection. The painting was subsequently entered in the 1968 Archibald Prize competition and won. The portrait was to hang in the Lane Cove town hall.

 Publications 
Pidgeon was invited to illustrate a number of books, and in some cases book covers:

 Willis, Collins. Rhymes of Sydney by Collins Wills and "Wep". First published in 1933. New edition 1982. 
 Raffaello, Carboni. The Eureka Stockade: the consequences of some pirates wanting on quarter-deck a rebellion, with an introduction by Herbart V. Evatt and illustrated by W. E. Pidgeon
 Simpson, Colin. Come Away Pealer, 1952 [Jacket design only]
 Warren, Marian. No Glamour in Gumboots, 1958
 Cullota, Nino (John O'Grady) They're a Weird Mob, 1959
 Davy, G. C. The Christian Gentleman: a book of courtesy and social guidance for boys, 1960 
 Cullota, Nino (John O'Grady) Cop this Lot, 1960 
 Pearl, Cyril. So, you want to buy a house .. and live in it. 1961
 Cullota, Nino (John O'Grady) Gone Fishin', 1962
 Pearl, Cyril. The Best of Lennie Lower presented by Cyril Pearl and Wep, 1963 
 O'Grady, John. Aussie English: an explanation of Australian idiom, 1965 
 O'Grady, John. The Things they do to you, [1969]

 Collections 

Pidgeon's paintings are held in the collections of the following organisations:

 Australian War Memorial
 Government House (Sydney)
 Great Synagogue
 National Library of Australia
 National Museum of Australia
 National Portrait Gallery
 New South Wales Art Gallery
 Newcastle Art Gallery
 Parliament House
 Royal Prince Alfred Hospital
 State Library New South Wales
 St Vincent's Hospital Sydney
 Sydney Children's Hospital
 University of New England
 University of New South Wales
 University of Sydney

 Legacy 
In 1988 Bloomfield Galleries, New South Wales held an exhibition of Pidgeon's war paintings.

In 1997 the Journalists' Club Sydney closed. The Archibald Prize winner painting of club President Ray Walker went missing. In May 2020 the Art Gallery of New South Wales put a call out for its return.

Over 400 works of art by Pidgeon were donated to the Australian War Memorial in 2014.  These included illustrated letters to his wife while working as a war correspondent and artist with Consolidated Press in New Guinea, Borneo, and Morotai in 1943–1945. It also includes his War Correspondent's Licence and Identification Card and paintings, sketches, drawings, photographs, and other ephemeral material relating to his time as a war correspondent. The collection was one of the largest donations received by the Memorial over the past ten years. The Memorial holds the most comprehensive collection of Pidgeon's work in Australia.

In 2015 the Australian War Memorial held an exhibition William Edwin Pidgeon (1909-1981), war correspondent and artist'' which presented a selection of over 400 works held in the Memorial's collection.

References

External links
William Edwin Pidgeon website
 Lambiek Comiclopedia article.
Australian Dictionary of Biography
"Illustration by Wep" tag on historical newspapers and more via Trove
The Australian Women's Weekly Covers by Wep list via Trove
Lane Cove Art Society WILLIAM EDWIN PIDGEON “WEP” (1909–1981)
William Edwin Pidgeon interviewed by Hazel de Berg in the Hazel de Berg collection (sound recording) National Library of Australia

Archibald Prize winners
1909 births
1981 deaths
20th-century Australian painters
20th-century Australian male artists
Australian cartoonists
Australian caricaturists
Australian comics artists
Australian male painters